The 2003–04 Macedonian First League was the 12th season of the Macedonian First Football League, the highest football league of Macedonia. The first matches of the season were played on 8 August 2003 and the last on 30 May 2004. Vardar were the defending champions, having won their fifth title. The 2003-04 champions were Pobeda who had won their first title.

Promotion and relegation

Participating teams

League table

Results
Every team will play three times against each other team for a total of 33 matches. The first 22 matchdays will consist of a regular double round-robin schedule. The league standings at this point will then be used to determine the games for the last 11 matchdays.

Matches 1–22

Matches 23–33

Top goalscorers

Source: rsssf.org

See also
2003–04 Macedonian Football Cup
2003–04 Macedonian Second Football League

External links
Macedonia - List of final tables (RSSSF)
Football Federation of Macedonia

Macedonia
1
Macedonian First Football League seasons